Laurel Networks was founded in 1999, and specialized in routers for telecommunications carriers.

Funding was provided in four rounds the first two of which were:

Round 1: $12.3m, led by New Enterprise Associates (NEA) and Rein Capital

Round 2: $60.0m, led by NEA, Trinity Ventures, Worldview Technology Partners and WorldCom Venture Fund

In 2005, after ultimately consuming $120m in venture capital funding, they were purchased by ECI Telecom for $88m, and formally renamed as the Data Networking Division within ECI.

Their primary product is the ST Series of service edge routers. ECI considers the router's ability to do complicated traffic shaping, monitoring and QoS at line rate to be its primary competitive advantage.

They are located in Robinson Township in the Pittsburgh region. They began the startup initially in Sewickley, PA.

On November 8, 2011, it was announced that the Pittsburgh office would be closed and that all employees would be laid off by September 30, 2012.

References

External links
 ECI Telecom, Data Networking Division web site

Companies based in Allegheny County, Pennsylvania
Telecommunications companies of the United States
Telecommunications companies established in 1999
American companies established in 1999
1999 establishments in Pennsylvania
Companies disestablished in 2012
2012 disestablishments in Pennsylvania
Defunct companies based in Pennsylvania